is a tiny near-Earth asteroid of the Apollo group, approximately  in diameter. It was first observed by the Mount Lemmon Survey on 1 February 2020, when it passed Earth very closely at a nominal distance of only . The object's orbital elements remain highly uncertain.

Description 

At the time, it was the closest approach in the year 2020. Since then,  made a closer approach on 4 May 2020.

The asteroid was first observed 1 February 2020 by the Mount Lemmon Survey at Mount Lemmon Observatory in the Santa Catalina Mountains northeast of Tucson, Arizona.

References

External links 
 List Of Apollo Minor Planets (by designation), Minor Planet Center
 
 
 

Minor planet object articles (unnumbered)
Discoveries by MLS
20200201
20200201